Brooklyn Eastern District Terminal 15 is a 0-6-0ST "Switcher" type steam locomotive owned and operated by the Strasburg Rail Road outside of Strasburg, Pennsylvania.

History
The engine was built in March 1917 by the H.K. Porter, Inc. for the Brooklyn Eastern District Terminal; it has a wheel arrangement of 0-6-0ST. The engine originally worked as a dockside switcher engine hauling freight trains for boats and ships. After all EBDT engines were retired and put out of service in 1963, No. 15 was purchased by the Southern Appalachian Railway in 1965, where it operated in occasional service.

In 1968, the Yancey Railroad offered steam trips between Micaville and Kona by using the No. 15 and two steel passenger coaches. This operation unfortunately was not a huge success and the locomotive along with the equipment was stored in Burnsville, North Carolina for several years before being sold.

In 1975, the Toledo, Lake Erie and Western Railway purchased No. 15 and placed it on static display for the next twenty-three years. The engine remained on display until 1998, when the Strasburg Rail Road purchased No. 15. When the locomotive arrived on the property on May 9, 1998, Strasburg planned to restore it as one of their operating units to haul their excursion trains; however, after a few test runs, the locomotive was problematic and its water tanks were too small to work the entire round trip. When film producer Britt Allcroft asked permission from Strasburg to film on their railroad for Thomas and the Magic Railroad, they brought an idea to her, about which she was thrilled: They planned to restore the engine into a full-size replica operating unit of Thomas the Tank Engine. After two and a half years of restoration work, the railroad converted the engine to burn coal instead of oil, and the locomotive made a test fire-up on April 14, 1999.

No. 15 eventually made its first official run on April 29, 1999 for the first annual Day Out with Thomas event. The engine has been used for the annual events ever since. It also has been occasionally transferred to other railroads for the same purpose, such as the Illinois Railway Museum, the Greenfield Village Line, the Great Smoky Mountains Railroad, and the Belvidere and Delaware River Railway. Thomas' original face was replaced in April 2014 with an animatronic CGI face with the mouth’s ability to open and close, and a voice speaker, recorded by Martin Sherman.

Gallery

See also 
 Canadian National 7312
 Reading 1187
 Great Western 90
 Canadian National 89
 Norfolk and Western 475
 Canadian Pacific 972

References

0-6-0 locomotives
Individual locomotives of the United States
Preserved steam locomotives of Pennsylvania
0-6-0T locomotives